Burning Chrome (1986) is a collection of short stories written by William Gibson. Most of the stories take place in Gibson's Sprawl, a shared setting for most of his early cyberpunk work. Many of the ideas and themes explored in the short stories were later revisited in Gibson's popular Sprawl trilogy.

Contents
Burning Chrome includes:

Reception
Dave Langford reviewed Burning Chrome for White Dwarf #83, and stated that "the fine title piece's hair-raising cyberspace jaunt is echoed all too closely in Neuromancer. Still, l like the story: it's that one about the young punks who get hold of a .45 and try the big heist, only Gibson's punks are computer jockeys and the .45 is a Russian military killer program."

J. Michael Caparula reviewed Burning Chrome in Space Gamer/Fantasy Gamer No. 82. Caparula commented that "This is vital reading; harsh, gritty, complex, visionary."

References

Sprawl trilogy
1986 short story collections
Science fiction short story collections
Cyberpunk short stories
American short story collections
Arbor House books